Kacper Laskoś (born 5 January 2000) is a Polish footballer who plays as midfielder for LKS Wójtowa.

Career

GKS Tychy
On 13 February 2019, Laskoś joined GKS Tychy.

Garbarnia Kraków
On 13 August 2020, he signed a 1,5-year contract with Garbarnia Kraków.

International career
Laskoś played three games for Poland U16, one for Poland U17 and three for Poland U18.

References

2000 births
People from Gorlice
Sportspeople from Lesser Poland Voivodeship
Living people
Polish footballers
Poland youth international footballers
Association football defenders
Sandecja Nowy Sącz players
Wisła Kraków players
GKS Tychy players
KSZO Ostrowiec Świętokrzyski players
Garbarnia Kraków players
Ekstraklasa players
II liga players
III liga players